"Change of Heart" is a song written by Naomi Judd, and recorded by American country music duo The Judds on their debut January 1984 extended play, Wynonna & Naomi. It was re-released in October 1988 as the second single from their Greatest Hits compilation album.  The song was their twelfth number one country single.  The single went to number one on the Billboard Hot Country Singles for one week and spent a total of fifteen weeks on the country chart.

Chart performance
"Change of Heart" debuted on the U.S. Billboard Hot Country Singles & Tracks for the week of October 22, 1988.

Year-end charts

References

1988 singles
1984 songs
The Judds songs
RCA Records Nashville singles
Curb Records singles
Songs written by Naomi Judd
Song recordings produced by Brent Maher